Mario Salani (born 12 October 1966) is an Italian former yacht racer who competed in the 1992 Summer Olympics.

References

External links
 
 
 

1966 births
Living people
Italian male sailors (sport)
Olympic sailors of Italy
Sailors at the 1992 Summer Olympics – Star
Star class world champions
World champions in sailing for Italy